Miloš Dimić (born 17 October 1989) is a Serbian professional basketball player for Vršac of the Basketball League of Serbia.

Professional career
Dimić was the best scorer and the MVP of the Basketball League of Serbia's Super League phase in the 2011–12 season, while playing for Radnički FMP. In December 2012, he signed with Radnički Kragujevac. In December 2014, he signed with KK Vršac.

On 26 March 2015, he signed with Bosnian defending champion Igokea until the end of the 2015–16 season. He debuted for the team in 67–56 loss to Cedevita Zagreb in Round 1 of the ABA League; he had miserable performance, 5 rebounds and 2 assists, while shooting 0 from 7 from the field in 20 minutes of action. On December 28, 2015, he parted ways with Igokea.

On 3 January 2018 Dimić signed with Borac Čačak for the rest of the 2017–18 season. He left the team in Summer 2018.

National team
Dimić was a member of the team that represented Serbia at the 2011 Summer Universiade in Shenzhen, finishing as the gold medal winners.

References

External links
 Miloš Dimić at aba-liga.com
 Miloš Dimić at eurobasket.com

1989 births
Living people
ABA League players
Basketball League of Serbia players
Competitors at the 2013 Mediterranean Games
KK Borac Čačak players
KK FMP (1991–2011) players
KK Radnički FMP players
KK Igokea players
KK Radnički Kragujevac (2009–2014) players
KK Vršac players
Mediterranean Games silver medalists for Serbia
Serbian expatriate basketball people in Bosnia and Herzegovina
Serbian expatriate basketball people in Slovakia
Serbian men's basketball players
Shooting guards
Sportspeople from Leskovac
Universiade medalists in basketball
Mediterranean Games medalists in basketball
Universiade gold medalists for Serbia
Universiade bronze medalists for Serbia
Medalists at the 2011 Summer Universiade
Medalists at the 2013 Summer Universiade